Haji Sawan Khan Gopang is a Union council of Hyderabad Taluka (rural) in the Sindh province of Pakistan. It has a population of            24,005.

References

Hyderabad District, Pakistan
Union councils of Sindh